Appleby is a railway station on the Settle and Carlisle Line, which runs between  and  via . It is owned by Network Rail and managed by Northern Trains.

The station was formerly known as Appleby West, with the older Appleby East station located nearby on the Eden Valley Railway. The buildings of Appleby East still survive.

History

The station was designed by the Midland Railway company architect John Holloway Sanders. Opened by the Midland Railway at the same time as the line itself in May 1876, it became part of the London, Midland and Scottish Railway during the Grouping of 1923.  The station then passed to the London Midland Region of British Railways on nationalisation in 1948. It was one of only two stations on the Settle-Carlisle line to remain open (Settle being the other) following the withdrawal of local stopping trains in May 1970.

When sectorisation was introduced in the 1980s, the station was served by Regional Railways until the privatisation of British Rail.

The line through the station is often used as a diversionary route for the West Coast Main Line for both passenger and freight trains. A pre-nationalisation milepost on the southbound platform marks the station's location  miles from London (St Pancras) on the Midland Railway route via Leicester, Derby, Sheffield and Leeds.

Stationmasters

E. Williamson 1876 - 1877
R. Kirkham 1877 - 1879
J.G. Sefton 1879 - 1880
W. Scott 1880 - 1886
W. Foster 1886 - 1889
Thomas Moss 1889 - 1892 (formerly station master at Armathwaite, afterwards station master at Kirkby Stephen)
William George Nuttall 1892 - 1924 (formerly station master at Kirkby Stephen)
James Roadley 1924 - 1930 (formerly station master at Bentham)
Richard W. Powell 1931 - 1936 (formerly station master at Lazonby, also station master at Ormside and Long Marton)
Edward H. Garner 1936 - 1943 (formerly station master of Spring Vale, Darwen, afterwards station master at Mansfield)
A. Fisher from 1943  (formerly station master at Embsay and Bolton Abbey)

Facilities
The main brick-built station building with booking office and waiting room is located on the northbound platform. This is the original building of 1876. A smaller brick-built waiting room, also of 1876, is located on the southbound platform. A period wrought iron lattice footbridge links the two platforms.  Step-free access to both is also available (via the road underbridge & ramps to the southbound platform, direct from the station entrance for northbound travellers).  The booking office is open for 9 hours, six days per week (not Sundays) - tickets can be purchased from a ticket vending machine when the office is closed.  Train running times are available via telephone and timetable posters, with digital information screens also in the process of being commissioned here (and at other stations on the line).

To the north are a number of engineers sidings (which once formed the connection to the Eden Valley branch to Warcop, Kirkby Stephen East and ) and an active signal box (which was repaired and refurbished in the autumn of 2019 to fix issues with rotten timbers and box foundations).

The main station building is Grade II listed; the waiting room on the northbound platform and the station's footbridge are separately Grade II listed. The footbridge was moved to Appleby West from Mansfield Station in 1901.

Services

There is generally a service every two hours daily northbound to Carlisle and southbound to Leeds - eight each way in total since the May 2018 timetable change, a modest improvement on the former schedule of seven northbound & six southbound trains on weekdays, plus an extra SX early morning departure to Kirkby Stephen only and an extra morning departure for Leeds on Saturdays that applied prior to May 2011.

Accidents and incidents 
 Well-known railway photographer and enthusiast Bishop Eric Treacy died at Appleby railway station on 13 May 1978 after suffering a heart attack whilst waiting to photograph Evening Star, which was due to pass through the station on a rail tour. A plaque located on the down platform commemorates the spot.
 Services had been disrupted from 28 January 2016, due to a landslip at Eden Brows (north of ) which destabilised the embankment on the eastern side of the railway, where it passes through the Eden Gorge. An emergency timetable was put into operation, with trains from the south terminating or starting at Appleby, and buses running between Appleby and Carlisle. Repair works were due to continue until the end of March 2017. These were completed on schedule, with the line reopening through to Carlisle on 31 March 2017.

Steam Specials
There is a water tank with water crane at the south end of platform 2 which is used to supply steam locomotives which stop with southbound trains during special excursions on the Settle and Carlisle line.

Gallery

See also
 Listed buildings in Appleby-in-Westmorland

Notes

References

Sources

External links

 
 

Railway stations in Cumbria
DfT Category E stations
Former Midland Railway stations
Railway stations in Great Britain opened in 1876
Northern franchise railway stations
Railway station
John Holloway Sanders railway stations
Grade II listed buildings in Cumbria